Vincent Rouffaer (1951 -) is a Belgian television director.
He directed Belgian TV series such as Alfa Papa Tango in 1990 and Alle maten since 1998.

TV Filmography
"Witse" (2004) TV Series 
"Alle maten" (1998) TV Series 
"Kongo" (1997) (mini) TV Series 
"Ware vrienden, De" (1993) TV Series 
Leraarskamer, De (1991) (TV) 
"Alfa Papa Tango" (1990) TV Series 
Hoogtevrees (1988) (TV) 
Kollega's maken de Brug, De (1988) 
... aka A Three-Day Weekend (Belgium: English title) 
... aka Collègues font le pont, Les (Belgium: French title) 
Ultieme kerstverhaal, Het (1987) (TV) 
"Dwaling, De" (1987) (mini) TV Series 
Lege cel, De (1986) (TV) 
"Hard Labeur" (1985) TV Series 
Huisbewaarder, De (1984) (TV) 
"Gewoel, Het" (1984) TV Series 
Geschiedenis mijner jeugd (1983) (TV) 
Souper, Het (1983) (TV) 
Nand funktie, De (1983) (TV) 
Cello en contrabas (1982) (TV) 
Met z'n allen door de vloer (1981) (TV) 
Maand op het land, Een (1979) (TV) 
Everard 't Serclaes (1979) (TV) 
"Collega's, De" (1978) TV Series

External links
 

Flemish television directors
1951 births
Living people